This is a list of North Korean operas.


List 
 Sea of Blood
 The Flower Girl
 Tell O' The Forest!
 The Story of A Nurse
 A True Daughter of the Party
 Song of Mt. Kumgang
 Victory of the Revolution Is in Sight
 Sea of Love
 Under the Bright Sun
 The Tale of Chun Hyang
 The Tale of Sim Chong
 Morning Glow at Tuman Riverside
 Women of Namgang Village
 Blood at an International Conference

See also 

 Korean revolutionary opera
 Music of North Korea

References

External links 
 , Performance of the DPRK National Symphony Orchestra

 
North Korea